Julian Hill Whittlesey (October 27, 1905 – May 20, 1995
) was a prominent American architect and planner who co-founded the firms Mayer & Whittlesey and then Whittlesey Conklin + Rossant.

Background
Whittlesey was born in Greenwich, Connecticut.  He studied civil engineering and architecture at Yale (degrees in 1927 and 1930).  He also studied on a fellowship to the American School of Classical Studies in Athens.

Career

In the early 1930s, Whittlesey worked for the Resettlement Administration and the U.S. Public Housing Administration. During World War II, he designed military-related housing and administrative buildings.

In 1935, he co-founded Mayer & Whittlesey, with Albert Mayer.  The firm designed Manhattan House and other large buildings.  They also helped design the cities of Kitimat, British Columbia, and Chandigarh, India.

In the 1950s, he co-founded Whittlesey, Conklin & Rossant, which designed Reston, Virginia.

Works

Buildings
 Manhattan House
 The Butterfield House
 240 Central Park South
 Printer's Industrial Welfare Building
 Bellmawr Homes
 James Weldon Johnson Houses (in association with Robert J. Reiley and Harry Prince)
 Rangel Houses (in Washington Heights)
 New School:
 Jacob M. Kaplan Building (West Twelfth Street) 
 Albert A. List Building (West Eleventh Street)

City plans
 Kitimat, British Columbia
 Chandigarh, India
 Reston, Virginia

Other
 UN Playground (with Isamu Noguchi)

See also
 Albert Mayer
 James Rossant
 Manhattan House

References

External sources
   

American urban planners
Architects from New York City
1905 births
1995 deaths